Caroline Wozniacki defeated Akiko Morigami in the final 6–3, 6–2.

Seeds

Draw

Finals

Top half

Bottom half

Qualifying

Seeds

 Maret Ani (first round)
 Mathilde Johansson (second round)
 Sandra Záhlavová (qualifying competition)
 Marina Erakovic (second round)
 Yuan Meng (qualifying competition)
 Anne Keothavong (first round, retired)
 Shiho Hisamatsu (second round)
 Kristina Brandi (second round, withdrew)

Qualifiers

Qualifying draw

First qualifier

Second qualifier

Third qualifier

Fourth qualifier

External links 
Main Draws
Qualifying Draws

2007 Tennis Channel Open